Blandy (also known as Blandy-les-Tours) is a commune in the Seine-et-Marne department in the Île-de-France region in north-central France.

Demography
The inhabitants are called Blandynois.

Places of interest
 Château de Blandy-les-Tours
 Church of Saint Maurice (14th et 16th centuries)

See also
Daniel Gittard (1625-1686), architect, born in Blandy-les-Tours
Communes of the Seine-et-Marne department

References

External links

1999 Land Use, from IAURIF (Institute for Urban Planning and Development of the Paris-Île-de-France région) 
 

Communes of Seine-et-Marne